Caritas was a private power yacht constructed in 1922 for sugar magnate J. Percy Bartram, a member of the New York Yacht Club. Launched at the shipyards of George Lawley & Son at Neponset, Boston, Massachusetts, it was designed by the naval architect firm Cox & Stevens of New York.

The deckhouse, pilot house, and all exterior brightwork were made out of teak wood. Furnishings and equipment on Caritas were worthy of being classed among the handsomest and most luxurious yachts of the time. Caritas was powered with a pair of 125 hp Winton gasoline engines and a speed of 12 mph.

She would later be known as Merdonia, Spitfire, Lockwood, Largo, and Aleta.

References

External links 
 Info Page for Motor Yacht LYNIE JANE by George Lawley & Son Corp

Yachts of New York Yacht Club members